Norma Fernandes is a teacher from Karachi, Pakistan.

Life

Fernandes was educated at St Joseph's Convent School, Karachi.

She started off her career teaching at St Patrick's High School, Karachi. She also was a sportswoman, a dramatist, and musician.

From 1966 to 2009, she worked first as a teacher and then as Headmistress (Kindergarten/Junior Section) of the Karachi Grammar School.

In January 2006, Norma Fernandes moved to a new area of responsibility within the Karachi Grammar School, as Advisor, working with the Board, the Principal and the Internal Management Team and also giving confidential advice to parents.

In 2009, she retired from the Karachi Grammar School after more than 50 years in education.

In 2013 The Citizens Archive of Pakistan interviewed Fernandes to obtain the story of her service. In a podcast, Fernandes talks about her memories of growing up in Karachi and when her entire family migrated to Canada, but she stayed behind to continue working in education.

On 14 August 2013, the Government of Pakistan announced that it would honour Fernandes on 23 March 2014 with the Tamgha-i-Imtiaz for her services to education. (It is the fourth-highest decoration given to any civilian in Pakistan based on their achievements).

References

Pakistani Roman Catholics
Heads of schools in Pakistan
Recipients of Tamgha-e-Imtiaz
Pakistani women
People from Karachi
Pakistani people of Goan descent
Living people
Year of birth missing (living people)
Pakistani schoolteachers